Concho Resources Inc. was a company engaged in hydrocarbon exploration, incorporated and organized in Delaware and headquartered in Midland, Texas, with operations exclusively in the Permian Basin. In 2021, the company was acquired by ConocoPhillips.

As of December 31, 2019, the company had  of estimated proved reserves, of which 63% was petroleum and natural gas liquids and 37% was natural gas. Of these reserves, 55% were in the Delaware Basin and 45% were in the Midland Basin.

History
In 2004, the company was founded as Concho Equity Holdings Corporation by a group of businessmen headed by Timothy A. Leach. 

Also in 2004, the company acquired properties from Lowe Management for $117million.

In 2006, the company acquired assets from Chase Oil and formed Concho Resources Inc.

In 2007, the company became a public company via an initial public offering.

In 2008, the company acquired Henry Petroleum for $584million. 

In 2010, the company acquired assets in the Permian Basin from Marbob Energy Corporation for $1.65billion. 

In 2012, the company acquired Three Rivers Operating Company for $1billion.

In October 2016, the company acquired assets in the Midland Basin from Reliance Energy for $1.625billion.

In November 2016, the company acquired assets in the Delaware Basin for $430million.

In July 2018, the company acquired RSP Permian.

On January 15, 2021, the company was acquired by ConocoPhillips.

References

External links
 

ConocoPhillips subsidiaries
Petroleum in Texas
2004 establishments in Texas
2007 initial public offerings
2021 disestablishments in Texas
2021 mergers and acquisitions
Companies formerly listed on the New York Stock Exchange
American companies established in 2004
Energy companies established in 2004
Non-renewable resource companies established in 2004